Ötzi a well-preserved natural mummy of a man who lived about 3,300 BCE.

Ötzi may also refer to:

 5803 Ötzi, a main belt asteroid
 DJ Ötzi (born 1971), Austrian entertainer